USS Forster (DE-334) was an Edsall-class destroyer escort built for the U.S. Navy during World War II.

Namesake
Edward William Forster was born 8 October 1884 in Jersey City, New Jersey. He enlisted in the Navy on 25 August 1919, and was warranted Machinist on 25 June 1942. On 17 August 1940, he joined  and was killed when it was sunk in the Battle of Savo Island, 9 August 1942.

Construction and commissioning
She was launched on 13 November 1943 by Consolidated Steel Corporation, Orange, Texas, sponsored by Mrs. E. W. Forster, widow of Machinist Edward W. Forster. Forster was commissioned 25 January 1944 and served as an escort in the Atlantic and Mediterranean during World War II. She was decommissioned and placed in reserve at Green Cove Springs, Florida on 15 June 1946.

Coast Guard service
She was turned over to the United States Coast Guard on 20 June 1951. Forster (given the Coast Guard hull number WDE-434) served on ocean station duty out of Honolulu. This included duty on Ocean Stations VICTOR, QUEEN, and SUGAR and voyages to Japan. She also conducted search and rescue duties, including finding and assisting the following vessels in distress: the M/V Katori Maru on 17 August 1952, assisting the M/V Chuk Maru on 29 August 1953, the M/V Tongshui on 1 – 3 October 1953, and the M/V Steel Fabricator on 26 October 1953. She was returned to the Navy on 25 May 1954.

Return to U.S. Navy service
Forster was converted from DE to DER 334 in the early 1950s in Long Beach California and she was recommissioned at Long Beach, California, 23 October 1956. She served as a part of the DEW (Defense Early Warning) Line in the North Pacific. And was stationed about 200 miles off the coast of Seattle, where she was based.  Typical duty would be two weeks on station, cruising North and South off the coast, then 2 weeks in port.  She was stationed out of Pearl Harbor in the 1960s and served in the Western Pacific on Operation Market Time in 1968-69 patrolling the South Vietnamese coast for contraband shipping and providing sea to shore fire when called upon. She served on patrol in the Formosa Straits in 1969.  She was transferred to the Atlantic fleet in late 1969.

Republic of Vietnam service
In February 1966, Forster escorted the nine cutters comprising Division 13 of Coast Guard Squadron One from Naval Base Subic Bay to Vung Tau in South Vietnam. She served in the Navy until she was transferred on 25 September 1971 to the Republic of Vietnam Navy. The Vietnamese reclassified her as a frigate and renamed her RVNS Trần Khánh Dư (HQ-04). In 1974, she participated in the Battle of the Paracel Islands.

Socialist Republic of Vietnam service
She was in a shipyard, in overhaul, when Saigon fell on 30 April 1975, and was captured by North Vietnamese forces. The Vietnam People's Navy renamed her VPNS Dai Ky (HQ-03), she was apparently still seaworthy in 1997 and was used as a training ship. By 1999, she was reduced to a training hulk.

Military awards and honors

Footnotes

References

External links
 NavSource Online: Destroyer Escort Photo Archive – USS Forster (DE 334)

Edsall-class destroyer escorts
World War II frigates and destroyer escorts of the United States
Ships transferred from the United States Navy to the United States Coast Guard
Ships transferred from the United States Navy to the Republic of Vietnam Navy
Ships of the Vietnam People's Navy
Ships built in Orange, Texas
1943 ships